Sariyev,  is a surname.  Notable people with the surname include: 

Anuar Sariyev
Rauan Sariyev (born 1994), Kazakhstani footballer
Temir Sariyev (born 1963), Kyrgyz politician
Zulfugar Sariyev